WNEC could refer to:

Western New England College, a school in Springfield, Massachusetts.
WNEC-FM, a radio station (91.7 FM) licensed to Henniker, New Hampshire.